Zbigniew Firlej (c. 1613–1649), of Lewart coat of arms, was a noble of the Polish–Lithuanian Commonwealth. Starost of Lublin. Son of Mikołaj Firlej and Regina Oleśnicka. Married to Anna Wiśniowiecka, daughter of Michał Wiśniowiecki (around 1636–1638); and to Katarzyna Opalińska, daughter of Łukasz Opaliński, in 1647.

References

1610s births
1649 deaths
Zbigniew